Farah Zeynep Abdullah (born 17 August 1989) is a Turkish actress.

Early life
Farah Zeynep Abdullah was born on 17 August 1989, in Beşiktaş, Istanbul. Her maternal grandfather is Turkish from Erzincan, while her grandmother is of Bosnian descent. Her maternal family also has Macedonian and Crimean origins. Her father, Osman, is of Iraqi Turkmen ancestry. Due to war, he immigrated to Turkey as a child, but still completed his military service in Iraq. Her paternal grandmother is originally from Pljevlja, Montenegro. Abdullah has two brothers. Her secondary education was spent at the Lycée Français Saint-Michel in Istanbul until her family moved to London due to her father's job.

Career

In 2010, during her studies at the University of Kent, Abdullah was offered a role in the melodrama Öyle Bir Geçer Zaman ki, for which she completed 2 seasons and 79 episodes. The series also won her a Best Supporting Actress award at the Antalya Television Awards in 2011.

In 2013, she appeared in Yılmaz Erdoğan's film Kelebeğin Rüyası ("The Butterfly's Dream") with Kıvanç Tatlıtuğ. It was selected by the Minister of Culture and Tourism as Turkey's candidate for the 2014's Academy Awards. For the role, Abdullah won the trophy for Best Supporting Actress at the 18th Sadri Alışık Cinema and Theatre Awards.

In 2014, she appeared in the film Bi Küçük Eylül Meselesi ("A Small September Affair") with Engin Akyürek. She then worked for the second time alongside Kıvanç Tatlıtuğ in the period drama Kurt Seyit ve Şura. Abdullah later starred in director Çağan Irmak's musical romance film Unutursam Fisilda ("Whisper If I Forget"). The role brought her multiple awards as she stunned audiences with her acting and singing skills.

In 2015, she voiced Princess Courtney in the Turkish version of Barbie in Rock 'N Royals. Later that year Abdullah completed Ekşi Elmalar ("Sour Apples"), her second project with director Yılmaz Erdoğan. The film was released on 28 October 2016 in Turkey and in early November in Europe.

In late July 2016, rumours of Abdullah joining the hit series Muhteşem Yüzyıl: Kösem ("Magnificent Century: Kösem") surfaced on social media. A few days later, it was confirmed that she had joined the series in the role of Hungarian princess Farya Bethlen.

In 2018 she played famous singer Ajda Pekkan in the fantasy comedy film Arif V 216, where she sang Pekkan's songs "Milyonzade" and "Boşvermişim Dünyaya". Abdullah then starred in the series Gülizar and the film Bizim İçin: Şampiyon ("For Us: Champion"), which tells the life story of jockey Halis Karataş.

Between 2020 and 2021, she worked alongside Birkan Sokullu in Masumlar Apartmanı ("Apartment of the Innocents"), which is adapted from a novel by Gülseren Budayıcıoğlu.

In 2022, Abdullah starred in the biographical film Bergen which became the highest grossing film of all time in turkey gaining over 160 million tl.

In 2023, Abdullah announced she will be starring in a new film called Bihter, the new adaption of the well-known novel in the 1900s Aşk-ı Memnu.

Personal life
In December 2022, in response to the question "Do you have a chronic disease?" on her social media account she said: "I have a cervical hernia, my thyroid does not work, I have Hashimoto's. I have a lesion in my brain. Also, my knee is very bad."

Filmography

Television series

Film

Discography

Awards and nominations

References

External links 
 
 Farah Zeynep Abdullah on TurkishStarsDaily

1989 births
Turkish people of Iraqi Turkmen descent
21st-century Turkish actresses
Living people
People educated at Claires Court School
Actresses from Istanbul
Turkish television actresses
Turkish film actresses
Turkish people of Bosniak descent
Alumni of the University of Kent
Iraqi Turkmen people
Turkish people of Bosnian descent
Turkish people of Macedonian descent